Slavko Kurbanović (born 3 September 1946) is a Serbian former swimmer. He competed in two events at the 1968 Summer Olympics for Yugoslavia.

References

1946 births
Living people
Serbian male swimmers
Yugoslav male swimmers
Olympic swimmers of Yugoslavia
Swimmers at the 1968 Summer Olympics
Sportspeople from Subotica